is a Japanese photographer who specializes in photographing dead bodies.

After graduation from Keio University, He worked as an adult video director and became a dead body photographer in 1994. He has taken pictures in Thailand, Colombia, Russia, Palestine and elsewhere.

Publications

Books
Sekaizankokukikou SHITAI NI ME GA KURANDE (死体に目が眩んで―世界残酷紀行, 2000)
Fight Review (ファイト批評, 2005)

Photobook
danse macabre to the HARDCORE WORKS (1996)

Videos
Junk film/Tsurisaki Kiyotaka tanpen shu (ジャンクフィルム/釣崎清隆残酷短編集, 2007)
Shigeshoshi Orozco (死化粧師オロスコ, 2008)

Notes

External links 
official site

Japanese photographers
1966 births
People from Toyama Prefecture
Japanese documentary film directors
Living people